Team Pratomagno Women was a women's UCI cycling team based in Uzbekistan, which competed in elite road bicycle racing events such as the UCI Women's Road World Cup. The team only existed in the 2013 women's road cycling season.

Major wins
2013
Grand Prix of Maykop, Natalia Boyarskaya
Overall Tour of Adygeya, Natalia Boyarskaya
Stages 2 & 4, Natalia Boyarskaya

National champions
2013
 Uzbekistan National Road Championship, Olga Drobysheva
 Russia National Road Championship, Svetlana Stolbova
 Uzbekistan National Time Trial Championship, Olga Drobysheva

References

External links

Cycling teams based in Uzbekistan
UCI Women's Teams
Cycling teams established in 2013
Defunct cycling teams
Cycling teams disestablished in 2013